Roman Catholic Archdiocese of La Plata or Archdiocese of La Plata may refer to :

 the current Roman Catholic Archdiocese of La Plata in Argentina
 the historical Roman Catholic Archdiocese of La Plata or Chacas in present Bolivia, now Metropolitan Roman Catholic Archdiocese of Sucré